Power Play is a weekly Dutch television program focused on video games that ran from 1992 through 1993 in the Netherlands on the TROS network. Initially the show ran bi-weekly, but in its second season, it became a weekly show. There were a total of 19 episodes, before the show was cancelled.

The show was 25 minutes long and was hosted by Martijn Krabbé, and featured items such as game reviews, tips and tricks and interviews with gamers and people working in the gaming industry.

Television shows about video games
1992 Dutch television series debuts
1993 Dutch television series endings
1990s Dutch television series